A social lubricant is any food, beverage, drug or activity that stimulates social interactions or helps people feel more comfortable in social occasions. Different cultures use different social lubricants for this purpose. Some common social lubricants are:
 Humor is the most prevalent social lubricant spanning all cultures and age groups.
 Alcoholic beverages (beer in pub culture, or wine in wine bars, for example)
 Coffee (in coffee cultures, for example)
 Tea (at tea parties, for example)
 Tobacco (in cigarettes or a hookah, for example)
 Small Talk (informal discourse or conversation, for example)

"Social lubricant" is sometimes used as a euphemism for a bribe or other improper payment.

See also
Recreational drug
Icebreaker (facilitation)

Socialization
Food and drink culture